Blanch or blanching may refer to:

People
 Andrea Blanch (born 1935), portrait, commercial, and fine art photographer
 Arnold Blanch (1896–1968), born and raised in Mantorville, Minnesota
 Stuart Blanch, Baron Blanch (1918–1994), Anglican bishop and archbishop
 Damien Blanch (born 1983), Australian-born Ireland international rugby league footballer
 Gertrude Blanch (1897–1996), American mathematician
 Joan Blanch (1937–2014), Spanish politician
 Johan Blanch, Occitan troubadour
 John Blanch (c. 1649–1725), British MP
 Lesley Blanch (1904–2007), British journalist, historian and travel writer 
 Lucile Blanch (1895–1981), American artist and Guggenheim Fellow
 Michael Blanch (born 1947), British diplomat
 Ulises Blanch (born 1998), American tennis player
 Blanch Yurka (1887–1974), American actress and director

Blanching
 Blanching (cooking), cooking briefly in boiling water
 Blanching (coinage), a method used to whiten metal
 Blanching (horticulture), growing vegetables in dark conditions to produce pale shoots or leaves

Other uses
 Blanch (medical), a temporary whitening of the skin due to transient ischemia
 Blanch fee, an ancient tenure in Scots land law
 Blanch, North Carolina, an unincorporated community

See also 
 Blanche (disambiguation)
 Blanca (disambiguation)